Atherinella crystallina  is a species of Neotropical silversides (Atherinopsidae). It is found from the Río Sinaloa to Río Verde, Jalisco, Sinaloa, Mexico. Their food includes zooplankton, pelagic fish larvae and pelagic fish eggs. A. crystallina was described as Thyrina crystallina by David Starr Jordan and George Bliss Culver in 1895 from types collected from the Río Presidio in Sinaloa, western Mexico.

References 

Fish described in 1895
crystallina
Freshwater fish of Mexico
Natural history of Sinaloa